Christian Holter (born 9 May 1972) is a retired Norwegian football defender.

He started his youth career in Heggedal IL, and made his senior debut for Asker SK at the age of 16. In 1992, he joined Bærum SK. From 1995 he played for Stabæk Fotball. He played 214 Norwegian Premier League games and 11 First Division games in 2005. He won the Norwegian Football Cup 1998. He retired after the 2005 season.

He has a relationship with retired handball player Janne Tuven. They live in Sandvika.

References

1972 births
Living people
People from Asker
Norwegian footballers
Asker Fotball players
Bærum SK players
Stabæk Fotball players
Eliteserien players
Norwegian First Division players
Association football defenders
Sportspeople from Viken (county)